Peralam is a village in Payyanur Taluk of Kannur district in the Indian state of Kerala.

Demographics
As of 2011 Census, Peralam village had total population of 7,607 which constitutes 3,548 males and 4,059 females. Population of the age group 0-6 was 652 (8.6%) where 322 are males and 330 females. Peralam had overall literacy of 93.6% where male literacy stands at 97.2% and female literacy was 90.5%.

Transportation
The national highway(NH 66) passes through Karivellur town. Goa and Mumbai can be accessed on the northern side and Cochin and Thiruvananthapuram can be accessed on the southern side.  The road to the east of Iritty connects to Mysore and Bangalore.  The nearest railway station is Payyanur on Shoranur-Mangalore section under Southern Railway.
The nearest airport is Kannur, about 65 km away.

References

Villages near Payyanur
Villages in Kannur district